Virtual LACP (VLACP) is an Avaya extension of the Link Aggregation Control Protocol to provide a Layer 2 handshaking protocol which can detect end-to-end failure between two physical Ethernet interfaces. It allows the switch to detect unidirectional or bi-directional link failures irrespective of intermediary devices and enables link recovery in less than one second.

With VLACP, far-end failures can be detected, which allows a Link aggregation trunk to fail over properly when end-to-end connectivity is not guaranteed for certain links through the internet in an aggregation group. When a remote link failure is detected, the change is propagated to the partner port.

See also
 MLT
 SMLT
 RSMLT

External links
 Virtual Link Aggregation Control Protocol (VLACP) Retrieved 29 July 2011
 ERS-8600 All Documentation -Retrieved 29 July 2011
 VSP 7000 Command Line Interface Commands Reference, Command: vlacp Retrieved 1 May 2020

Avaya
Ethernet
Link protocols
Network protocols
Network topology
Nortel protocols